Cymothoe aramis, the orange-red glider, is a butterfly in the family Nymphalidae. It is found in Nigeria, Cameroon, the Republic of the Congo, Gabon, the Central African Republic and the Democratic Republic of the Congo. The habitat consists of forests.

The larvae feed on Rinorea dentata.

Subspecies
Cymothoe aramis aramis (Nigeria: Cross River loop, Cameroon, Congo, Gabon, Central African Republic)
Cymothoe aramis schoutedeni Overlaet, 1952 (Congo, Democratic Republic of the Congo: Ubangi, Mongala, Uele, north Kivu)

Gallery

References

External links
 Cymothoe aramis aramis at u-bordeaux1.fr
 Cymothoe aramis at v2.boldsystems.org

Butterflies described in 1865
Cymothoe (butterfly)
Butterflies of Africa
Taxa named by William Chapman Hewitson